Koorvere (also known as Kuurvere) is a village in Põlva Parish, Põlva County in southeastern Estonia.

As of 2011 Census, the settlement's population was 41.

References

Villages in Põlva County